Dynoides is a genus of isopod crustaceans in the family Sphaeromatidae, containing the following species:

 Dynoides amblysinus (Pillai, 1954)
 Dynoides artocanalis Nunomura, 1997
 Dynoides barnardii Baker, 1928
 Dynoides bicolor Nunomura, 2010
 Dynoides brevicornis Kussakin & Malyutina, 1987
 Dynoides brevispina Bruce, 1980
 Dynoides castroi Loyola e Silva, 1960
 Dynoides crenulatus Carvacho & Haasmann, 1984
 Dynoides daguilarensis Li, 2000
 Dynoides dentisinus Shen, 1929
 Dynoides elegans (Boone, 1923)
 Dynoides globicauda (Dana, 1853)
 Dynoides indicus Müller, 1991
 Dynoides longisinus Kwon, 1990
 Dynoides saldani Carvacho & Haasmann, 1984
 Dynoides serratisinus Barnard, 1914
 Dynoides spinipodus Kwon & Kim, 1986
 Dynoides viridis Bruce, 1982

References